Msuka Mjini Ruins (Swahili Mji wa Kale wa Msuka Mjini) is protected historic site located inside Micheweni District of Pemba North Region in Tanzania. Msuka Mjini has a Swahili mosque from the fifteenth century  preserved in ruins on the Kigomasha peninsula on the island. The date 816AH (1414 CE) is carved on the interior of the circular mirhab.

See also
Historic Swahili Settlements
Archaeology of Pemba Island

References

Swahili people
Swahili city-states
Swahili culture
Pemba Island